is a Japanese baseball player who played as a left-handed relief pitcher in Nippon Professional Baseball.  He played for the Fukoka Hawks from 2004–2010 and the Chunichi Dragons from 2010–2014.  He was named the Pacific League's Rookie of the Year for 2004, with 55 appearances, throwing 67 and 2/3 innings, a 4-3-1 record and a 3.06 ERA with 28 saves.  His nickname is "Mise manager".

Biography
Mise was born in Kagawa Prefecture in 1976.  He played as an outfielder in high school, but eventually switched to being a pitcher.  In college, he played on Okayama University of Science's team.

External links

1976 births
Living people
Baseball people from Kagawa Prefecture
Japanese baseball players
Nippon Professional Baseball pitchers
Fukuoka Daiei Hawks players
Fukuoka SoftBank Hawks players
Chunichi Dragons players
Nippon Professional Baseball Rookie of the Year Award winners